Gamma Lupi, Latinized from γ Lupi, is a 3rd-magnitude, B-type blue giant star in the constellation of Lupus. It is also known in ancient Chinese astronomy as 騎官一 or "the 1st (star) of the Cavalry Officer". With a telescope, Gamma Lupi can be resolved into a binary star system in close orbit. This is known as the Gamma Lupi AB system, often abbreviated as γ Lupi AB or γ Lup AB. 

Gamma Lupi A is itself a spectroscopic binary with a period of 2.849769 days. Although the system does not show eclipses, the hotter star of the pair heats the side of the cooler star that faces it, and as they orbit each other the combined starlight varies in brightness by about 0.02 magnitudes, as seen from the Earth.

This star is a proper motion member of the Upper Centaurus–Lupus sub-group in the
Scorpius–Centaurus OB association,
the nearest such co-moving association of massive stars to the Sun.

See also 
 Traditional Chinese star names#Lupus

References

B-type subgiants
Triple star systems
Upper Centaurus Lupus

Lupus (constellation)
Lupi, Gamma
CD-40 09760
138690
076297
5776